Canoe camping, also known as touring, tripping or expedition canoeing, is a combination of canoeing and camping. Like backpacking, canoe campers carry enough with them to travel and camp for several days, but do so via a canoe or kayak.

Description 
A canoeist can transport significantly heavier and bulkier loads than a backpacker or even a kayaker can. Portaging by foot is sometimes necessary to pass between water bodies or around hazardous obstacles such as rapids or waterfalls, but most of the time canoe campers travel on water. Because they usually don't continuously carry their gear on their backs, canoe campers can bring more food and gear and undertake longer trips. This is especially the case with food which, unlike gear where the weight is essentially fixed regardless of the trip duration, increases in weight for each additional day of provision. On rivers, high water levels after storms can make river travel hazardous, while on lakes, winds and thunderstorms can produce strong winds which create large waves and headwinds which work against paddlers to slow the canoe. Trips may need to have extra days built into the schedule in case of weather delays.

Although some experienced canoeists feel comfortable paddling straight through large bodies of water, most typically stay within a few hundred meters of shore. Since a fully loaded touring canoe only draws about 14 cm (six inches), it can approach a rocky shore as close as arm's-length. This proximity (and a canoe's inherent quietness) lets the canoeist observe aquatic and near-shore plants and wildlife from a perspective that walking on solid ground does not allow. Many people engage in fishing while canoe camping.

The versatility of canoe tripping allows canoeists to go places and see things that they otherwise could not.

Many canoeists use specialized canoe packs designed for both easy portaging and loading into canoes. Waterproof dry bags are frequently used to keep important items dry in case of inclement weather or capsizing.

History 

Native Americans of many different tribes who used canoes for transportation, needed to "canoe camp" regularly.  Before the construction of modern means of transportation and transportation routes, the most effective way to travel through the vast expanses of northern wilderness was to navigate the countless small waterways by canoe. Their canoe was perfect for this purpose, as it was relatively easy to carry, fast, able to traverse a wide variety of different water ways (small streams to huge lakes), and able to carry large loads.

It was for all these reasons that the early French explorers of North America, such as Louis Jolliet, quickly adopted the use of the Native American canoe. With them came Jesuit missionaries, coureurs des bois, and voyageurs. Once trading posts were established in the interior, the canoe continued to be the primary transportation method, supplying such posts with regular canoe brigades. In northern Quebec, this practice continued until the middle of the 20th century.

As the "wilderness" of the Americas was tamed by the construction of the railroad and later roads, the canoe as a means of primary transportation lost its practicality. It turned into a recreational sport, a way for Americans and others to experience the pre-European America, and have a glimpse of a formerly never-ending wilderness. While recreational canoe camping has been enjoyed since the late 19th century by sporting and boating enthusiasts, it was not until later in the 20th century that, with the advent of camping consumer goods, it gained mass appeal.

The history of the Grand Portage, MN is an excellent metaphorical microcosm for the larger change and the eventual invention of the idea of "canoe camping"… for fun.

Notable proponents and expeditions 
He was 64 years old and in frail health at the time.

The adventure memoir Canoeing with the Cree relates Eric Sevareid's youthful journey with a companion from Minnesota to Hudson Bay in 1930.

In Canada, Bill Mason, who was an author, artist, filmmaker, and environmentalist, published several books and produced a number of films in the 1970s that greatly advanced the popularity of canoe camping.

Calvin Rutstrum was a wilderness canoeist and author, whom Bill Mason said "totally influenced me" and "he became my hero".

Like Mason and Sevareid, a number of modern-day canoeists have retraced the historic routes of the fur-traders and voyageurs and published books about their experiences. Noteworthy examples from Canada include Coke Stop in Emo: Adventures of a Long-Distance Paddler by Alec Ross, Canoeing a Continent: On the Trail of Alexander MacKenzie by Max Finkelstein and Where Rivers Run by Joanie and Gary McGuffin.

Sigurd Olson, conservationist and north woods writer, traveled and camped by canoe extensively. These included long trips as he wrote about in his book The Lonely Land and well as frequent shorter trips covered in many of his books.

Eric W. Morse, author, historian and notable wilderness canoe tripper traveled with Sigurd Olson. He authored books on their wilderness trips and on historical fur trade canoe routes in Canada.

In the "Source to Sea expedition" of 2005, two students from North Carolina State University paddled  down the Mississippi and Atchafalaya Rivers to support the Audubon Society's Upper Mississippi River Campaign.

The book New York to Nome by Rick Steber details the story of Sheldon Taylor and Geoffrey Pope who paddled from New York City April 25, 1936, to Nome, Alaska, August 11, 1937. This was the longest recorded canoe trip in history until 1980.

Henry David Thoreau, an American author and advocate of environmental conservation, provided a written account of a long distance canoeing expedition in his book The Maine Woods. Thoreau's canoeing expedition in Maine covered remote areas that can still be experienced in Maine's Hundred Mile Wilderness.

Popular destinations

Australia
 The Yarra River, Victoria
 Murray River, Victoria & New South Wales
 Brisbane River, Queensland

Canada
 Algonquin Provincial Park, Ontario
 Bowron Lake Provincial Park, British Columbia
 Churchill River, Saskatchewan and Manitoba
 Dumoine River, Quebec (whitewater)
 Gatineau Park, Quebec
 George River, Nunavik, Quebec
 Kejimkujik National Park, Nova Scotia
 Killarney Provincial Park, Ontario
 Lakeland Provincial Park & Recreation Area, Alberta
 La Vérendrye Wildlife Reserve, Quebec
 McLennan Lake, Saskatchewan
 Main Lake Canoe Route, Quadra Island, British Columbia
 Manigotagan River, Manitoba
 Missinaibi River, Ontario (whitewater)
 Moisie River, Quebec
 Nahanni River, North West Territories (whitewater)
 Nitinat Triangle, British Columbia
 Nopiming Provincial Park, Manitoba
Powell Forest Canoe Route, Powell River, British Columbia
 Pukaskwa National Park, Ontario
 Quetico Provincial Park, Ontario
 Sayward Forest Canoe Route, British Columbia
 Temagami area including Lake Temagami and Lady Evelyn-Smoothwater Provincial Park, Ontario
 Whiteshell Provincial Park, Manitoba

Germany
 Mecklenburg Lake District, Mecklenburg-Vorpommern

Hungary
 Bodrog River, Borsod-Abaúj-Zemplén County
 Hernád River, Borsod-Abaúj-Zemplén County
 River Ipoly, Nógrád County and Pest County
 Rába River, counties of Vas and Győr-Moson-Sopron
 Sajo River, Borsod-Abaúj-Zemplén County
 Tisza River

New Zealand
 Whanganui River, North Island

Poland
 Obra, Lubuskie
 Krutynia
 Czarna Hańcza
 Brda
 Pilica

United States
 Allagash Wilderness Waterway, Maine
 The Boundary Waters Canoe Area Wilderness, Minnesota
 Voyageurs National Park, Minnesota
 Everglades National Park, Florida
 Ross Lake, North Cascades, Washington state
 Saint Regis Canoe Area, Adirondack Mountains, New York
 Northern Forest Canoe Trail, Old Forge, New York to Fort Kent, Maine
 Ozark National Scenic Riverways, Missouri
 Green River, Utah
 Sylvania Wilderness, Michigan
 Isle Royale National Park, Michigan
 Umbagog Lake, New Hampshire/Maine

References

Further reading
 Bill Mason, Song of the Paddle: An Illustrated Guide to Wilderness Camping, Firefly Books, 1988. 
 Eric W. Morse, Freshwater Saga, Northword Press, July 1987. 
 Sigurd F. Olson, The Lonely Land, New York, 1961.

External links

 Canadian Canoe Routes
 Canoeing guide

Canoeing
Camping